Yelena Anatolyevna Antonova (born October 10, 1974 in Moscow, USSR) is a Russian Synchro-swimmer.

She has Olympic gold medal in team competition in 2000 and won three European Championships (1995, 1999, 2000).

She was a member of National team in 1994-2000,Now She Is Director Of Public Relationship And Promotion For Russian Special Olympics.

External links
 Yelena Antonova's profile 

Russian synchronized swimmers
Olympic synchronized swimmers of Russia
Synchronized swimmers at the 1996 Summer Olympics
Synchronized swimmers at the 2000 Summer Olympics
Olympic gold medalists for Russia
1974 births
Living people
Swimmers from Moscow
Olympic medalists in synchronized swimming
Medalists at the 2000 Summer Olympics